Between the Lines is a television police drama series created by J. C. Wilsher and produced by World Productions for the BBC. It was first shown on BBC1 between 1992 and 1994, running for three series.

The show centred on the eventful life of Detective Superintendent Tony Clark, played by Neil Pearson. Clark was an ambitious member of the Complaints Investigation Bureau (CIB), an internal organisation of the Metropolitan Police that investigates complaints against officers as well as claims of corruption inside the police force. Along the way Clark had to overcome strong influence from his superiors and problems in his private life, most notably the break-up of his marriage following an affair with WPC Jenny Dean (Lesley Vickerage). Throughout the series Clark was assisted by colleagues Harry Naylor (Tom Georgeson) and Maureen 'Mo' Connell (Siobhan Redmond).

The show became a surprise hit for the BBC, winning a British Academy Television Award (BAFTA) for Best Drama Series in 1994. In 2000 it was voted into the 100 Greatest British Television Programmes by the British Film Institute. The series was reviewed in an episode of the BBC documentary series Call the Cops, which stated the series had "found a way of getting to grips with the corruption scandals of the 1990s".

Executive producer Tony Garnett had begun his career as an actor before becoming a producer in the late 1960s. His credits included The Wednesday Play and Play for Today. Following Between the Lines, he went on to produce several popular and notable series including This Life (1996–97), Ballykissangel and The Cops (1998–2000).

Plot
Clark's work as a lead officer in CIB was the focus of the first two series. In the first series his boss was Deakin, a tough ex-RUC Northern Irish policeman. At the end of the first series, Deakin was revealed to be a corrupt officer himself. He left the force but remained a recurring character, working freelance for the security services and others, sometimes in conflict with Clark and sometimes assisting him. At the start of the third series (after a dramatic shoot-out at the end of the second) Clark, Naylor and Connell leave the police force and work in the murky world of private security, far-right political groups and espionage.

The third series ends with the betrayal of Clark and Naylor who had been masquerading as mercenaries. The betrayal is made by Connell in league with Deakin, their former boss and nemesis. It is unclear whether Clark and Naylor have died as the show ended on a cliffhanger. Rumours of a remake did circulate for some years, but Pearson confirmed in 'Watching the Detectives' that he had wanted a 'final' ending at the time and would never return to the role.

Between The Lines was one of the first British TV dramas to include a bisexual character (whose sexual orientation is incidental rather than central to the plot). Maureen (Mo) Connell (Siobhan Redmond) has two significant romantic partners during the series, a serious boyfriend in season 2, and later on a long-term girlfriend. While some other police officers are briefly shown making disapproving comments (e.g. when she brings her girlfriend as plus-one to a police social), her bisexuality is shown as completely accepted by close colleagues, if a subject of occasional friendly banter (e.g. Mo mentions having a date that night, Tony asks "girl or boy?" and she replies sarcastically "one of each").

Background
Until the 1970s, complaints against the police in Britain were dealt with internally, with no outside oversight, leading to public dissatisfaction amid allegations that misconduct and corruption were not being effectively dealt with. The 1976 Police Act established the Police Complaints Board, an independent review body, but following the Scarman Report in 1982 this was replaced by the more effective Police Complaints Authority, creating the background of the series. However, even today, under the current Independent Police Complaints Commission (IPCC), the majority of complaints against the police are dealt with internally. The IPCC investigates the most serious cases and deals with appeals.  At the time of the series in the 1990s, the department of the Metropolitan Police responsible for internal investigations was the Complaints Investigation Bureau (CIB); it has subsequently been replaced by the Directorate of Professional Standards (DPS).

The two first series of Between the Lines is a dramatisation of the work of the CIB. In the third series focus is shifted more towards the secret services and MI5 in particular. John Deakin, whose shadow is present throughout all three series, has a past in the Ulster police. He is the "fireproof" high rank detective who decides which other high ranked detectives that may use which methods. Tony manages to discover who he really is, but not good enough. Deakin also has contacts in the secret services. And the final two episodes ("The End User" 1 & 2) deals with a story of illegal weapon smuggling to Northern Ireland. Although set primarily in London, one episode was filmed partly in Bolton, with the Town Hall appearing in several scenes.

Guest stars in the series included many well-known British actors who have gone on to star in other major television dramas and/or movies, including Daniel Craig, James Nesbitt, Jerome Flynn, Bernard Hill, David Morrissey, Jaye Griffiths, Paul Brooke, Francesca Annis, Sylvestra Le Touzel, John Hannah, Michael Kitchen, David Hayman, Hermione Norris, Edward Tudor-Pole, Ray Winstone, Larry Lamb, Hugh Bonneville, Marc Warren and Jonny Lee Miller. Most of them were unknown or less known, prior to their appearances in this series.

Cast
 Neil Pearson as Detective Superintendent Tony Clark
 Tom Georgeson as Detective Inspector Harry Naylor
 Siobhan Redmond as Detective Sergeant Maureen "Mo" Connell
 Tony Doyle as Chief Superintendent John Deakin
 Robin Lermitte as Detective Superintendent David Graves 
 David Lyon as Commander Brian Huxtable
 Lesley Vickerage as WPC Jenny Dean
 Hugh Ross as Commander Graham Sullivan
 John Shrapnel as Deputy Assistant Commissioner Dunning 
 Jerome Flynn as Detective Sergeant Eddie Hargreaves

Episodes

Series 1 (1992)

Series 2 (1993)

Series 3 (1994)

Broadcast
In Ontario, Canada, the program was retitled Inside the Line because the broadcaster TVOntario already had a current affairs program called Between the Lines and did not want them confused.

DVD release
The complete series of Between The Lines has been released on DVD (Region 2) by 2 Entertain/Cinema Club with music edits.

References

External links

1990s British drama television series
1992 British television series debuts
1994 British television series endings
Between the Lines
1990s British crime television series
English-language television shows
Television shows set in London
Police corruption in fiction